Clavatula virgineus is a species of sea snail, a marine gastropod mollusk in the family Clavatulidae.

Description
It is a spineless form of Clavatula muricata (Lamarck, 1822).

Distribution
This species occurs in the Red Sea and in the Atlantic Ocean off Guinea.

References

 Vine, P. (1986). Red Sea Invertebrates. Immel Publishing, London. 224 pp

External links
 

virgineus
Gastropods described in 1817